David's Mother is a 1994 American made-for-television drama film directed by Robert Allan Ackerman and stars Kirstie Alley as a devoted mother trying to cope with her autistic teenage son David (Michael Goorjian). The film aired on CBS on April 10, 1994, it has also aired internationally. In the UK it can often be seen on television movie channels True Movies 1 and True Movies 2. It has also been released in home entertainment formats in countries including the United States, UK and Australia.

The film has received several awards and nominations. Kirstie Alley and Michael Goorjian both received Emmy Awards for their roles in the film; Alley was also nominated for a Golden Globe Award.

Plot
Sally Goodson has always tried to do what is best for her autistic son David, always blaming herself for the way David is. Sally lives alone with David in a New York City apartment and is often visited by her sister Bea (Stockard Channing), who tries to help Sally turn her life around by getting out a little more and giving David some space, but Sally rarely lets him out of her sight. In the end, it caused her husband Philip (Chris Sarandon) to have an affair, leave her and re-marry, and her daughter Susan to go to live with him, as they were tired of watching Sally being too over-protective with David.

Sally, having enough to cope with in her life, is visited by a social worker, Gladys Johnson (Phylicia Rashad), who informs her that David must go into a care home, but Sally refuses to send him to a home because of the way he was treated as a child in his previous care home. Gladys then gives her some time with David before she has to make arrangements. Bea manages to talk Sally round and sets her up on a date with wallpaper salesman John Nils (Sam Waterston); they begin to see each other, and he even teaches David to work a VCR, something Sally thought he could never do. Things go well until Sally makes plans to move when she is forced to give up David to a care home; her plans cause an argument between her and John, as she didn't tell him of the move. Sally is finally forced to give up David, as he is permanently taken in by the care home.

Cast
Kirstie Alley ... Sally Goodson
Sam Waterston ... John Nils
Stockard Channing ... Bea
Michael A. Goorjian ... David Goodson
Chris Sarandon ... Philip
Phylicia Rashad ... Gladys Johnson

Awards and nominations

Releases
David's Mother has been released on VHS and DVD format. In the United States, the film received its DVD release on May 4, 2004 by Trinity Home Entertainment. In the UK, the film has been released several times. The first VHS was released by Odyssey Entertainment It was also released on VHS as part of a "Tear Jerker Collection". On DVD it was released by Odyssey Entertainment on September 25, 2000, which includes the trailer and cast information. It was re-released on DVD by Infinity Entertainment on February 4, 2008. In Australia, the film was released on DVD by Payless Entertainment on January 24, 2008.

References

External links

Movie review by Bonnie Sayers

1990s American films
1990s English-language films
1994 drama films
1994 films
1994 television films
American drama television films
CBS network films
Films about autism
Films about disability in the United States
Films about mother–son relationships
Films directed by Robert Allan Ackerman